The Ukrainian football league system has developed over the years.

Since the fall of the Soviet Union, all professional clubs from Ukraine have joined own national football competitions as the Soviet competitions transitioned to Russian. The amateur-level clubs/teams played at Ukrainian republican competitions always. The top two tiers traditionally have a single group with double round robin system. The third tier, while having the same type of competition organization, usually has two groups organized geographically. The depth of the national league competitions is about four levels. Regional competitions in oblasts and the autonomous republic usually have one or two tiers, while selected regions had up to five tiers sometimes.

Parallel to the senior team, there are also junior team competitions, separate student league, female competitions, and other types of football (indoor, beach, others). Female association football, which was struggling after the fall of the Soviet Union, has shaped into a more stable competition with its own two-tier league competition and junior team tournament.

League system (senior teams, male)

Evolution of the Ukrainian football league system

League system (senior teams, female)
Unlike male club sport that has multiple organizations, female football is administered by a one "All-Ukrainian Association of Women Football" that until 2012 did not have full membership within the Ukrainian Association of Football (at that time FFU). Only the Higher League has a status of professional.

League system (youth teams)
The league system is more based on age. All for levels are national leagues. Regional leagues organize own youth competitions along with adults. In independent Ukraine the first youth competition were established in 1998 and had two categories senior and junior.

In 2001 those competitions were transformed into the FFU Youth League which conducts competitions in four categories based on age. The league also has two divisions for each category between each takes place rotation of teams. Following that, in 2002 there were established youth competitions of the Professional Football League of Ukraine which were conducted among players under 19 of age.

Lads

Gals

Organization

National competitions

Professional status
The first three levels of the football League system in Ukraine are the professional level competitions, the rest are the amateur and sometimes inconsistent. The first four levels are the national type competitions and divided among three independent football organizations:
 Premier League of Ukraine regulates Ukrainian Premier League and its Under-21 and Under-19 League;
 Professional Football League of Ukraine regulates the First League and the Second League;

Amateur status
 Ukrainian Football Amateur Association regulates the Amateur Championships and Amateur Cup.
There is also national youth competition that consists of the youth teams from all of the professional clubs as well as some of the amateurs and schools of Olympic Reserve. The competitions are divided among several age group of participants between ages of 14 and 17. Each professional club is obliged to be represented with at least one team in those competitions.

Regional
The regional competitions are considered amateur and primarily organized by the football organizations of their respective regions. For some period there existed the FFU Council of Regions that was providing some degree of uniformity between the competitions of different regions and answering to the Executive Committee of FFU. There are 27 members of the council including representatives from the cities of Kyiv and Sevastopol. Similar to the national, each regional organization also have a leagues system, but usually do not exceed two levels. There are also cup competitions of each region. The regional youth competitions are organized consequently with the senior competitions and each round of those takes place usually a day prior. Each regional football association has the right upon conclusion of a season recommends the best club or clubs of their choice to the Ukrainian Football Amateur Association.

Student
There also is the Student Football League, which is less notable and it is NOT a part of the league system. The players of the league represent Ukraine in Universiadas as a national team. There were some discussions to spread a similar type of competition through Europe. The national student team sometimes is composed of professional-level players and can be considered as a type of B-team.

Number of professional clubs
With asterisk (*) identified leagues which in certain season carried transitional (semi-professional) status.

References

Football league systems in Europe